National Popular Party may refer to:

National Popular Party (Romania), a political party in Romania
Parti national populaire, a political party in Quebec

.